In mathematics, Knuth's up-arrow notation is a method of notation for very large integers, introduced by Donald Knuth in 1976.

In his 1947 paper, R. L. Goodstein introduced the specific sequence of operations that are now called hyperoperations. Goodstein also suggested the Greek names tetration, pentation, etc., for the extended operations beyond exponentiation. The sequence starts with a unary operation (the successor function with n = 0), and continues with the binary operations of addition (n = 1), multiplication (n = 2), exponentiation (n = 3), tetration (n = 4), pentation (n = 5), etc.
Various notations have been used to represent hyperoperations.
Knuth's up-arrow notation  is an alternative notation. It is obtained by replacing  in the square bracket notation by  arrows.
For example:
 the single arrow  represents exponentiation (iterated multiplication) 
 the double arrow  represents tetration (iterated exponentiation) 
 the triple arrow  represents pentation (iterated tetration) 
The general definition of the up-arrow notation is as follows (for ):

Here,  stands for n arrows, so for example

Introduction
The hyperoperations naturally extend the arithmetical operations of addition and multiplication as follows.
Addition by a natural number is defined as iterated incrementation:

   
Multiplication by a natural number is defined as iterated addition:

For example,

Exponentiation for a natural power  is defined as iterated multiplication, which Knuth denoted by a single up-arrow:

For example,

Tetration is defined as iterated exponentiation, which Knuth denoted by a “double arrow”:

For example,

Expressions are evaluated from right to left, as the operators are defined to be right-associative.

According to this definition,

 

etc.

This already leads to some fairly large numbers, but the hyperoperator sequence does not stop here.

Pentation, defined as iterated tetration, is represented by the “triple arrow”:

Hexation, defined as iterated pentation, is represented by the “quadruple arrow”:

and so on. The general rule is that an -arrow operator expands into a right-associative series of -arrow operators. Symbolically,

Examples:

Notation
But many environments — such as programming languages and plain-text e-mail — do not support superscript typesetting. People have adopted the linear notation  for such environments; the up-arrow suggests 'raising to the power of'. If the character set does not contain an up arrow, the caret (^) is used instead.

The superscript notation  doesn't lend itself well to generalization, which explains why Knuth chose to work from the inline notation  instead.

 is a shorter alternative notation for n uparrows. Thus .

Writing out up-arrow notation in terms of powers
Attempting to write  using the familiar superscript notation gives a power tower.

For example: 

If b is a variable (or is too large), the power tower might be written using dots and a note indicating the height of the tower.

Continuing with this notation,  could be written with a stack of such power towers, each describing the size of the one above it.

Again, if b is a variable or is too large, the stack might be written using dots and a note indicating its height.

Furthermore,  might be written using several columns of such stacks of power towers, each column describing the number of power towers in the stack to its left:

And more generally:

This might be carried out indefinitely to represent  as iterated exponentiation of iterated exponentiation for any a, n and b (although it clearly becomes rather cumbersome).

Using tetration

The Rudy Rucker notation  for tetration allows us to make these diagrams slightly simpler while still employing a geometric representation (we could call these tetration towers).

 

 

 

Finally, as an example, the fourth Ackermann number  could be represented as:

Generalizations
Some numbers are so large that multiple arrows of Knuth's up-arrow notation become too cumbersome; then an n-arrow operator   is useful (and also for descriptions with a variable number of arrows), or equivalently, hyper operators.

Some numbers are so large that even that notation is not sufficient. The Conway chained arrow notation can then be used: a chain of three elements is equivalent with the other notations, but a chain of four or more is even more powerful.

 = , Since  =  = , Thus the result comes out with 

Even faster-growing functions can be categorized using an ordinal analysis called the fast-growing hierarchy. The fast-growing hierarchy uses successive function iteration and diagonalization to systematically create faster-growing functions from some base function . For the standard fast-growing hierarchy using ,  already exhibits exponential growth,  is comparable to tetrational growth and is upper-bounded by a function involving the first four hyperoperators;.

These functions are all computable. Even faster computable functions, such as the Goodstein sequence and the TREE sequence require the usage of large ordinals, may occur in certain combinatorical and proof-theoretic contexts. There exists functions which grow uncomputably fast, such as the Busy Beaver, whose very nature will be completely out of reach from any up-arrow, or even any ordinal-based analysis.

Definition

Without reference to hyperoperation the up-arrow operators can be formally defined by

This definition uses exponentiation  as the base case, and tetration  as repeated exponentiation.  This is equivalent to the hyperoperation sequence except it omits the three more basic operations of succession, addition and multiplication.

One can alternatively choose multiplication  as the base case and iterate from there. Then exponentiation becomes repeated multiplication. The formal definition would be

Note, however, that Knuth did not define the "nil-arrow". One could extend the notation to negative indices (n ≥ -2) in such a way as to agree with the entire hyperoperation sequence, except for the lag in the indexing:

If ambiguity is not an issue parentheses are sometimes dropped.

Tables of values

Computing 0↑n b

Computing  results in
0, when n = 0  
1, when n = 1 and b = 0   
0, when n = 1 and b > 0   
1, when n > 1 and b is even (including 0)
0, when n > 1 and b is odd

Computing 2↑n b

Computing  can be restated in terms of an infinite table. We place the numbers  in the top row, and fill the left column with values 2. To determine a number in the table, take the number immediately to the left, then look up the required number in the previous row, at the position given by the number just taken.

Computing 3↑n b

We place the numbers  in the top row, and fill the left column with values 3. To determine a number in the table, take the number immediately to the left, then look up the required number in the previous row, at the position given by the number just taken.

Computing 4↑n b

We place the numbers  in the top row, and fill the left column with values 4. To determine a number in the table, take the number immediately to the left, then look up the required number in the previous row, at the position given by the number just taken.

Computing 10↑n b

We place the numbers  in the top row, and fill the left column with values 10. To determine a number in the table, take the number immediately to the left, then look up the required number in the previous row, at the position given by the number just taken.

For 2 ≤ b ≤ 9 the numerical order of the numbers  is the lexicographical order with n as the most significant number, so for the numbers of these 8 columns the numerical order is simply line-by-line. The same applies for the numbers in the 97 columns with 3 ≤ b ≤ 99, and if we start from n = 1 even for 3 ≤ b ≤ 9,999,999,999.

See also
Primitive recursion
Hyperoperation
Busy beaver
Cutler's bar notation
Tetration
Pentation
Ackermann function
Graham's number
Steinhaus–Moser notation

Notes

References

External links
 
 Robert Munafo, Large Numbers: Higher hyper operators

Mathematical notation
Large numbers
Donald Knuth
1976 introductions